Absolute Monarchs  is an American post-punk Music band from Seattle, Washington.

History
The Absolute Monarchs formed in 2009. In 2011, the band was named one of "6 NW Bands You Need to Know" by Spin.com. In 2012 the band was playing in clubs and acting as an opening band at concerts in the Seattle area. Absolute Monarchs were featured to perform at the 57th Grammy Award Ceremonies at the 2012 Capitol Hill Block Party. The band released one full-length album through Good to Die Records and one 7" through Big Tea Records (UK) before calling it quits in August 2013.   Kock and Stubz then went on to form a new band, Blood Drugs. In 2016 the Monarchs reunited to perform at Good to Die Records five year anniversary concert.  The group also performed at the 2016 Capitol Hill Block Party and several local venues.

Members 

 Shawn Kock - guitar 
 Joel Schneider - bass / vocals
 Mike Stubz - drums
 Miki Sodos - guitar

Discography 

 1 (2012)
 "To Hell, Let's Masquerade" / "Thinking Thieves" 7" (2012)

References

External links 
 Official Bandcamp page

American post-punk music groups
Punk rock groups from Washington (state)